Madame Wants No Children may refer to:
 Madame Wants No Children (1926 film), a German silent drama film
 Madame Wants No Children (1933 film), an Austrian-German comedy film